Iván Ignacio Sandoval Pizarro (born 22 April 1995) is a Chilean footballer who plays as a midfielder for Deportes Iberia.

Career
Sandoval started off with Cobresal, joining their academy in 2009. He made his first appearances for the club during 2014, featuring in four out of six of Cobresal's Copa Chile group stage encounters as they advanced as runners-up. Sandoval made his professional league debut on 22 February 2015 during a Chilean Primera División fixture with Santiago Wanderers, he was substituted on in the second half at 0–0 with Cobresal eventually winning 1–0. In the 2016–17 campaign, Sandoval scored four goals; notably scoring a brace against Huachipato in April 2016. They ended 2016–17 with relegation to Primera B de Chile.

Career statistics
.

References

External links

1995 births
Living people
People from Santiago
People from Santiago Province, Chile
People from Santiago Metropolitan Region
Footballers from Santiago
Chilean footballers
Association football midfielders
Chilean Primera División players
Primera B de Chile players
Segunda División Profesional de Chile players
Cobresal footballers
San Luis de Quillota footballers
Deportes Vallenar footballers
Deportes Iberia footballers